Thomas Beecham (3 December 1820 – 6 April 1907) was the founder of Beechams, a large pharmaceutical business.

Career

Born in Curbridge in Oxfordshire, Beecham became a shepherd's boy at the age of 8 and it is in this role that he learnt about herbal medicine.

For a while he worked as the village postman in Kidlington but in 1847 he moved to Wigan, where he started selling Beecham's Pills which were a laxative. By 1859 he was based in St Helens where he started advertising as well as selling his pills. He created a network of agents throughout Lancashire and Yorkshire and by 1880 he had expanded his business so much that he was able to open his first factory.

In 1893 he moved to Southport, where he fully retired within three years. He died in Southport in 1907 and is buried in St Helens. He left £86,680 in his will.

Family
In 1847, he married Jane Evans and together they went on to have two sons and two daughters. He subsequently married Sarah Pemberton in 1873 and Mary Sawell in 1879. His elder son was Sir Joseph Beecham, 1st Baronet, and his grandson was the noted conductor Sir Thomas Beecham. His younger son was William Eardley Beecham. A great grandchild was the poet Audrey Beecham.

References

1820 births
1907 deaths
Businesspeople in the pharmaceutical industry
19th-century British businesspeople